Buzica is a village and municipality in Košice-okolie District in the Kosice Region of eastern Slovakia.

Geography
The village is located around 26 km southwest of Košice on the border with Hungary.

History
Historically the village was first mentioned in 1262.

Population
In 1910, the village had a population of 1088, mostly Hungarians.
According to the official census of 2011, the population included 1195 inhabitants, of which 628 were Hungarians and 425 were Slovaks whilst there were 122 people in the village who declined to admit their national affiliation.

Genealogical resources

The records for genealogical research are available at the state archive "Statny Archiv in Kosice, Slovakia"

 Roman Catholic church records (births/marriages/deaths): 1741-1895 (parish A)
 Greek Catholic church records (births/marriages/deaths): 1791-1896 (parish B)
 Reformated church records (births/marriages/deaths): 1741-1920 (parish A)

See also
 List of municipalities and towns in Slovakia

References

External links

Surnames of living people in Buzica

Villages and municipalities in Košice-okolie District
Hungarian communities in Slovakia